William Henry Selden (February 4, 1885 – December 19, 1941), alternately spelled "Seldon" and nicknamed "Bee", was an American Negro league infielder in the 1910s.

A native of Van Wert, Ohio, Selden made his Negro leagues debut in 1910 with the Chicago Giants. He played for the Indianapolis ABCs from 1912 to 1914. Selden died in Van Wert in 1941 at age 56.

References

External links
  and Seamheads

1885 births
1941 deaths
Chicago American Giants players
Chicago Giants players
French Lick Plutos players
Indianapolis ABCs players
Schenectady Mohawk Giants players
Baseball players from Ohio
People from Van Wert, Ohio
20th-century African-American people
Baseball infielders